Church of the Transfiguration is a historic Episcopal church located at Henderson and Charles Streets in Saluda, Polk County, North Carolina.  It was built in 1889, and is a one-story Carpenter Gothic-style church with a steeply pitched gable roof and board and batten siding.  It features a two-tiered square corner bell tower and pointed arch stained glass windows.  A vestry addition was built in 1968.

It was added to the National Register of Historic Places in 1982.

References

Episcopal church buildings in North Carolina
Churches on the National Register of Historic Places in North Carolina
Carpenter Gothic church buildings in North Carolina
Churches completed in 1889
19th-century Episcopal church buildings
Buildings and structures in Polk County, North Carolina
National Register of Historic Places in Polk County, North Carolina